Daniele dos Santos de Paula Batista (born 2 April 1983), known as just Daniele, is a Brazilian footballer who plays as a forward for the  Brazil women's national football team. She was part of the team at the 2011 FIFA Women's World Cup. At the club level, she has played for Vasco da Gama in Brazil.

References

External links
 
 

1983 births
Living people
Brazilian women's footballers
Brazil women's international footballers
Place of birth missing (living people)
2011 FIFA Women's World Cup players
Women's association football forwards
Pan American Games medalists in football
Footballers at the 2011 Pan American Games
Pan American Games silver medalists for Brazil
Medalists at the 2011 Pan American Games
Clube de Regatas do Flamengo (women) players
CR Vasco da Gama (women) players
Sociedade Esportiva Kindermann players